Ameivula pyrrhogularis is a species of teiid lizard endemic to Brazil.

References

pyrrhogularis
Reptiles described in 2013
Lizards of South America
Reptiles of Brazil
Taxa named by Marcélia Basto da Silva
Taxa named by Teresa C.S. Ávila-Pires